Dina Abdulkhalikovna Khafizova (Mirzaeva) (born September 24, 1984) is a retired Uzbekistani and American freestyle wrestler who competed in the women's 51-kg. She earned a silver medal at 2005 Asian Wrestling Championships. Multiple Uzbekistan national champion.

Biography
Dina was born in Tashkent, Uzbekistan. She started training in Judo at the age of 10 and begun Wrestling at the age of 19, after high school, she jointed Police academy. In 2014 she moved to the United States, in 2019 she got American citizenship. 
Dina married to 2008 & 2012 Greco-Roman Olympian Ildar Hafizov. In present, she works as a volunteer in the U.S. Olympic & Paralympic training centre.

Championships and achievements
Asian Wrestling Championships 2005 – 2nd (51 kg)
World Wrestling Championships 2005 – 7th (51 kg)
Asian Games 2006 – 10th (48 kg)
Ivan Yarygin Golden Grand-Prix 2007 – 3rd (51 kg)
Alexander Medved international 2007 – 3rd (51 kg)

References 

Uzbekistani female sport wrestlers
1982 births
Wrestlers at the 2006 Asian Games
Living people
Place of birth missing (living people)
World Wrestling Championships medalists
Asian Games competitors for Uzbekistan